Turnovo may refer to:

 Veliko Tarnovo, a city in Bulgaria
 Malko Tarnovo, a town in Bulgaria
 Turnovo, North Macedonia, a village in North Macedonia
 Turnovo, Republic of Bashkortostan, a rural locality in Russia

See also 
 Trnovo (disambiguation)
 Târnova (disambiguation)